Éric Neuhoff (born 4 July 1956) is a French novelist and journalist. He debuted in 1982 a journalist at  Le Quotidien de Paris and used a style nicknamed "néo-hussard", after the Hussards movement of the 1950s. He thus became associated with writers such as Denis Tillinac, Patrick Besson and Didier Van Cauwelaert, who debuted around the same time and used a similar style. He received the 1990 Roger Nimier Prize, and has received awards such as the Prix des Deux Magots, Prix Interallié and Grand Prix du roman de l'Académie française.

He has worked as a journalist and film critic for France Inter, Canal+ Cinéma and Madame Figaro. He co-wrote the screenplay for the 2001 film Savage Souls, directed by Raúl Ruiz.

Works
1982: Précautions d'usage, La Table Ronde
1984: Un triomphe, Olivier Orban
1984: Nos amies les lettres, Olivier Orban
1986: Des gens impossibles, La Table Ronde
1987: Lettre ouverte à François Truffaut, Albin Michel
1989: Les Hanches de Laetitia, Albin Michel, Roger Nimier Prize 1990
1992: Actualités françaises, Albin Michel
1992: Comme hier, Albin Michel
1993: Pas trop près de l'écran (with Patrick Besson), Le Rocher
1994: Michel Déon, Le Rocher
1995: Barbe à papa, Prix des Deux Magots
1997: La Petite Française, Prix Interallié
1998: Champagne !, Albin Michel
1998: La Séance du mercredi à 14 heures, La Table Ronde
2001: Un bien fou, Albin Michel, Grand Prix du roman de l'Académie française
2003: Histoire de Frank, Fayard
2006: Quand les brasseries se racontent, Albin Michel
2007: Pension alimentaire, Albin Michel
2009: Les Insoumis, Fayard
2012: Mufle, Albin Michel, Prix Trop Virilo 2012
2013: Dictionnaire chic du cinéma, Écriture
2014: L'amour sur un plateau (de cinéma), L'Herne
2015: Dictionnaire chic de la littérature étrangère, Écriture
2016: Deux ou trois leçons de snobisme, Écriture
2017: Costa Brava, Albin Michel
2018: Les Polaroïds, Le Rocher
2019: (Très) cher cinéma français, Albin Michel, Prix Renaudot Essai
2020: Sur le vif, Le Rocher
2022: Rentrée littéraire, Albin Michel

References

Writers from Paris
1956 births
Living people
French film critics
20th-century French journalists
21st-century French journalists
20th-century French novelists
21st-century French novelists
French male screenwriters
French screenwriters
French male novelists
Prix Interallié winners
Prix des Deux Magots winners
Roger Nimier Prize winners
Chevaliers of the Légion d'honneur
20th-century French male writers
21st-century French male writers
French male non-fiction writers
Prix Renaudot de l'essai winners
Grand Prix du roman de l'Académie française winners